Dorothea Friederike of Brandenburg-Ansbach (12 August 1676 – 13 March 1731) was the daughter of Margrave John Frederick of Brandenburg-Ansbach (1654–1686) and his first wife, Margravine Johanna Elisabeth of Baden-Durlach (1651–1680).  She was a half-sister of Queen Caroline of Great Britain, the wife of King George II.

On 20 (or 30) August 1699, Dorothea Friederike married Count Johann Reinhard III of Hanau-Lichtenberg.  She was the last Countess of Hanau.  The marriage produced one daughter: Charlotte Christine Magdalene Johanna (1700–1726).  Charlotte was the sole heiress of the county of Hanau and married on 5 April 1717 Crown Prince Louis VIII of Hesse-Darmstadt (1691–1768).

Friederike Dorothea died on 13 March 1731 and was buried on 17 or 25 March 1731 in the family vault of the Hanau counts in the St. John's Church (Hanau) (currently known as Old St. John's Church) in Hanau. The tomb was largely destroyed in the bombing of the Second World War.

References 
 Reinhard Dietrich: The state constitution in the Hanau Territory, Hanau's History Magazine 34, Hanau 1996, 
 Rudolf Lenz: Catalogue of funeral sermons and other writings of sadness in the Hesse Higher Education and State Library = Marburger staff research journal 11, Sigmaringen 1990
 Uta Lowenstein: The county of Hanau from the end of the 16th Century until the seizure by Hesse, in: New Magazine for Hanau's History, 2005, p. 11ff.
 Reinhard Suchier: genealogy of the Countly House of Hanau, in: Festschrift of the Hanau Historical Association for his fifty-year jubilee celebration on 27 August 1894, Hanau 1894
 Reinhard Suchier: The grave monuments and coffins of the member sof the Houses of hanau and hesse buried in Hanau, in: Program of the Royal Grammar School in Hanau, Hanau 1879, p. 1-56
 Richard Wille: The last Count of Hanau-Lichtenberg, in: Communications of the district of Hanau, Hesse Society for History and Geography vol 12, Hanau, 1886, p. 56-68.
 Ernst J. Zimmerman.Hanau city and country'' Third Edition, Hanau, 1919, ND 1978

Footnotes 

House of Hanau
1676 births
1731 deaths
House of Hohenzollern
Dorothea Friederike
Dorothea Friederike
Daughters of monarchs